Denney may refer to:

 Denney, Territoire de Belfort, a commune in Belfort department, France
 Denney (surname), people with the surname Denney